ELLAKTOR Group is the largest infrastructure group in Greece and one of the leading in Southeastern Europe, with an international presence and a diversified portfolio of activities, focusing on construction, concessions, environment, renewable energy and real estate development.

With operations in 22 countries and nearly 7,500 employees, ELLAKTOR Group generates a turnover of €915.5  million (2021).

Combining 70 years of expertise in the most complex and demanding projects with the latest technologies, ELLAKTOR Group breathes life into projects that accelerate growth and improve the quality of life in communities across the world.

21 years after the triple merger of Elliniki Technodomiki, AKTOR and TEV that created ELLAKTOR, the Group is redefined by setting modern corporate governance as a cornerstone and by giving priority to enhancing Group operations, to reorganizing capital structure and to further capitalizing on synergies, in order to provide increased added value to its shareholders, its employees and the Greek economy.

ELLAKTOR Group is among the top 100 global manufacturing groups (Global Powers of Construction 2020, Deloitte-July 21).

Historic Milestones
ELLAKTOR Group combines 70 years of experience, as it is the product of a merger of three large and historic construction companies of Greece, the Volos Engineering Company (TEB), founded in 1949, Elliniki Technodomiki, founded in 1955 and AKTOR, which started its operation in 1977.

The process which led to the creation of ELLAKTOR Group began in 1999 and was completed in 2002, with the absorption of the construction branches of ELLINIKI TECHNODOMIKI S.A. and TEB S.A. by AKTOR S.A., followed by the merger of ELLINIKI TECHNODOMIKI S.A. and TEB S.A. This process resulted in the Group’s parent company ELLINIKI TECHNODOMIKI – TEB S.A., which, in 2008 was renamed ELLAKTOR SOCIETE ANONYME with the trade name ELLAKTOR S.A.

As a result of the rapid growth of the construction sector in Greece in the late 1990s and the trend of mergers and acquisitions that prevailed to enable the creation of strong Infrastructure Groups having the financial and engineering capacity to respond to the high demand for new infrastructure projects during the 2000s, other construction companies joined ELLAKTOR Group through mergers and acquisitions, including TOMI S.A., KASTOR S.A. and PANTEHNIKI S.A.

Already from early 2000 the Group started diversifying its activities, expanding beyond the until then purely construction activity, in areas like real estate development, concessions, waste management and wind parks, through the establishment, acquisition or absorption of respective companies (AKTOR CONCESSIONS S.A., HELECTOR S.A. EL.TECH. ANEMOS S.A.).

During the same period, the Group also expanded its activities beyond the Greek borders with the establishment of subsidiaries and branches in Southeast Europe and the Middle East.

Group Companies

 Ellactor
 Actor
 Actor Concessions
 Helector
 R.E.D.S

References

External links

Construction and civil engineering companies of Greece
Holding companies established in 1977
Companies based in Athens
1977 establishments in Greece
Companies listed on the Athens Exchange
Holding companies of Greece